Nurettin Sönmez (born november   23,  1978) is a Turkish actor and martial arts teacher. He is best known for his role as "Bamsı Beyrek" in historical series Diriliş: Ertuğrul.

Early life
Sönmez was born on 23 November 1978 in Istanbul. He is a child of an immigrant family. His mother is an Albanian immigrant. His father, Ümit Sönmez, is a dentist. Nurettin Sönmez graduated from Istanbul University Mining Engineering Department. He then went to the Dialog Communication Acting School of Can and Arsen Gürzap and graduated from there. Later, he studied theatre at Yeditepe University.

Career
Sönmez started his acting career in 1999 with the Akşam Güneşi series, in which he shared the lead role with Serdar Gökhan, Pelin Batu and Sumru Yavrucuk.

He started to attract attention with the character of Gaddar Ali, which he portrayed in the series Osmanlı'da Derin Devlet, published in 2013. Since 2014 he has become well known with the character of Bamsı Beyrek in the series Diriliş: Ertuğrul and its sequel Kuruluş: Osman.

Besides acting, Sönmez is also an instructor about Far East sports, providing training and seminars in Turkey and abroad.

Filmography

Television

Film

References

External links 
 
 

Living people
1978 births
Male actors from Istanbul
Turkish male television actors
21st-century Turkish male actors
Istanbul University alumni
Yeditepe University alumni
Turkish people of Albanian descent